SATEL is a Finnish radio modem manufacturer that specializes in developing independent radio networking technology solutions for various industrial applications i.a. land surveying, SCADA, machine control, intelligent transportation systems, telemetry, environmental monitoring and Industrial Internet.

About the Company 

SATEL develops and sells high quality private radio technology solutions that enable secure, mission critical connections. The company was founded in 1986. SATEL’s first product was a wrist alarm, shortly followed by production of the first radio modem. Product development has been guided by emphasizing RF sensitivity and ensuring reliability and durability.

Both SATEL's product development and factory are located in Finland. The distribution network of SATEL covers over 100 countries. Approx. 90% of sales is exported.

SATEL has a long tradition of environmentally friendly practices, and the company performs highly in ESG criteria (Environmental, Social and Governance). The technology is made to last and it is used in many applications that bring environmental, operational and financial benefits.

Radio modems in general 

A radio modem transmits data over a wireless connection to another radio modem over a point-to-point or -multipoint link. Radio modems are independent of mobile and satellite network operators and no cost is thus associated with transferring data. Private radio modem networks can use either unlicensed (e.g. ISM band) or licensed frequency bands (UHF, VHF).

The operation range of a radio modem varies depending on the transmission power, antenna gain and mast height, and environment. In rural areas a 1 W radio modem with a line-of-sight radio link may range over 20 km and even up to 50 km in exceptionally amicable environments. In dense metropolitan areas, a corresponding range may vary from several kilometers to over 10 km. With a 35 W radio modem, a range of up to 80 km can be reached in favorable environments. By using radio modem repeaters, much broader areas can be covered.

SATEL radio technology enables independent and safe network. It offers reliability and high availability under all circumstances. The configuration of SATEL radio technology is easy, and it can be integrated with adjacent technologies. In addition, the life-cycle costs are low.

Products

Serial and TCP/IP communication
The  SATEL radio modem family offers transparent serial data communication (RS-232, RS-485, RS-422). These products are used in applications ranging from Mt Everest to power distribution networks and from professional motor sports to runway telemetry at airports. Lightweight SATEL-TR4+ / SATEL-TR49 modules are designed to be integrated into a host device, for instance for transfer of GNSS correction data in a land surveying rover or real-time kinematic (RTK) base station.

The SATEL XPRS IP radio router family, which was introduced in November 2008, broadened the offering to TCP/IP based applications. It is based on a Linux operating systems and enables customer specific applications.

Setup made easy with license-free products 
SATELLINE-EASy 869 and SATEL Compact-Proof 869 modems operate in the Europe-wide license-free 869.400 - 870 MHz band. Both have a maximum transmit power 500 mW, which enables coverage up to 5 km. Both models are also available for Indian licence-free 865 - 867 MHz frequency band, with max 1 W output power. By setting up a network with repeater radio modems, much longer distances can be achieved.  The radio modems can accommodate point-to-point as well as point-to-multipoint communications.

Higher power – longer range 
The radio modems of the SATELLINE-EASy and SATEL-EASy+ -family are suitable for high-end applications requiring a longer range. With these radio modems, a reliable radio modem network can be built across vast areas.

Radio modems are available for both the UHF (330 - 473 MHz) and VHF (135 - 174 MHz and 218 - 238 MHz) frequency bands. The modems using the VHF frequencies are specifically designed for data applications, where large distances with obstacles such as Mountains and valleys are to be spanned.

Different channel widths (12.5 / 20 / 25 / 50 kHz) and data rates up to 115200 bit/s are available in order to meet both the needs of the system and the requirements of the local authorities. The transmit power is adjustable between 100 mW and 1 W. In addition, radio modems with high 35W transmitter power are available. This allows transmission distances of up to several tens of kilometers, depending on the environment and the used antenna type. Typical applications include machine control, utility distribution networks, water facilities, precision farming and land surveying.

Withstands wind and weather 

In many applications, radio modems are used in the field and must withstand wind and weather conditions. Offshore installations pose the additional burden of salt water and mist. In such harsh environments, the SATELLINE-EASy Pro, in its rugged aluminum case with IP67 rating, can be used. Thanks to the maximum output power of 25 or 35 W it can range up to 80 km at transmission speeds of up to 19200 bit/s.

For outdoor usage other good options are SATEL Proof-TR4+ / -TR9 heavy-duty radio modems with the IP69K rating, which is the highest protection available. It protects against ingress of dust, high temperature and high-pressure water. The products consist of the IP69K sealed housing and a radio module from the following frequency variants: 403–473 MHz and 902–928 MHz ISM licence-free band.

Compatibility 

As there is no de facto standard for long range narrow band data communication, cross brand compatibility is an important aspect for radio modem deployers. In 2009, SATEL introduced product variants that are compatible with products from other manufacturers who use the so-called PCC protocol.

Radio technology in various applications  

SATEL radio technology can be used in various mission-critical applications such as SCADA, machine control, smart farming, ITS, autonomous vehicles, GNSS, offshore, environmental monitoring and Industrial Internet. Mission-critical nature of these applications calls for very tight requirements for connectivity, reliability, accuracy, and security.  
 
Many of the applications that use radio modems make operations more sustainable, safe and productive.  
Automated machine guidance, for example, enhances the quality of work and productivity. Many studies support this. Vennapusa & al note the huge possibilities in productivity gains that can be achieved by using Automated Machine Guidance on earthwork project: productivity gains can vary between 5 % to 270 % and cost-savings between 10 % to 70 %. Another study by Aöalsteinsson shows that when measurements are done by a GPS machine guidance, time savings in excavation of a trench were 22,93 % and fuel savings 22,19 % in comparison to the traditional way.  
 
Another example is smart farming. It improves production in a sustainable way; more and better food can be produced with a lesser impact on environment. Many studies show that smart farming will lead to quantifiable gains. A Danish study by Jensen & al concluded that Controlled Traffic-Farming (CTF) can reduce greenhouse gas emissions through reducing fuel, fertilizers and pesticides. Reduction in fuel costs can be 25–27 %  and savings in fertilizers and pesticides 3–5 %. Another study by Dammer and Adamek (2012) showed that the use of sensor-controlled technology reduced insecticide use by 13 %, and the investment cost was paid back in just 2 years. A study by the Association of Equipment Manufacturers (AEM), the American Soybean Association, CropLife America, and National Corn Growers Association notes increased productivity, more efficient fertilizer use, reduced herbicide use, decrease in fossil fuel use, and decrease in water use.

External links
SATEL homepage

References

Electronics companies of Finland
Companies established in 1986
Finnish brands